Regional elections were held in Nigeria in 1960 and 1961. The elections were held in Western Region in July 1960, in Northern Region in May 1961 and in Eastern Region in November 1961.

Results

Eastern Region

Northern Region

Western Region

References

Nigeria
Nigeria
Regional elections in Nigeria